La Paz, officially the Municipality of La Paz, is a 2nd class municipality in the province of Tarlac, Philippines. According to the 2020 census, it has a population of 68,952 people.

History
The early history of La Paz is unclear. Legends state that there was an old pueblo called "Cama Juan" situated along the bank of the Chico River, bordering the province of Tarlac and Nueva Ecija. When the Chico River  overflowed during a storm, a great flood swept the entire pueblo during the night. The flood is said to have devastated the area, claiming many lives.

This forced the inhabitants of "Cama Juan" to evacuate. The old site (Cama Juan) is known as "Balen Melakwan" or "Abandoned Town".

The inhabitants chose a field of evergreen grass and shrubbery on which to rebuild, which they named "Matayumtayum".

Towards the end of the nineteenth century, Francisco Macabulos and Captain Mariano Ignacio selected a more centrally located site for the future town to be known as La Paz. This existed only as a barrio of the town of Tarlac until 1892, when it was separated from the latter and rechristened in honor of its patron saint Nuestra Senora de La Paz y Buen Viaje. Its emergence as a new town gave its citizens a chance to run their own government with Martin Aquino as the first Governadorcillo.

La Paz was made the first seat of the revolutionary government of the province of Tarlac during the Spanish regime with Gen. Francisco Makabulos as its first provincial governor.

Geography
It is bounded on the north by the town of Victoria, on the east by the Province of Nueva Ecija, on the south by the town of Concepcion and on the west by Tarlac City.

La Paz is politically subdivided into 18 barangays, of which barangays San Isidro and San Roque are considered as urban areas and the rest of the barangays are considered rural areas.

Barangays
La Paz is politically subdivided into 22 barangays:

Climate

Demographics

Economy

Tourism

The feast of Nuestra De Seṅora De La Paz every January 23 to 24. Other tourism attractions in the town include Macabulos ancestral house, Nuestra Seṅora De La Paz Church, and Chico River Grill Station.

Transportation

The roads are paved with either concrete, asphalt, gravel or dirt.

La Paz is the northern terminus of the Subic–Clark–Tarlac Expressway (SCTEx) where it connects with Tarlac–Pangasinan–La Union Expressway (TPLEx) and Central Luzon Link Expressway (CLLEx).

Several buses from Metro Manila going Nueva Ecija passes through the town via Subic–Clark–Tarlac Expressway (SCTEx).

Points of interest
 (F-1790) Shrine of Our Lady of Peace and Good Voyage (Nuestra Señora de la Paz y Buen Viaje),  La Paz 2314 Tarlac, Philippines  (Titular: Our Lady of Peace and Good Voyage, Feast day, January 24; Former Parish Priest: Father Ramon Capuno  under the Roman Catholic Diocese of Tarlac; Pilgrims seek healing;   Vicariate of Immaculate Conception (Victoria, Tarlac) Vicar Forane: Father Vely Lapitan.LA PAZ: THE CORRIDOR OF UPCOMING MARKET GROWTH AND BOOM

Gallery

References

External links

La Paz Profile at PhilAtlas.com
[ Philippine Standard Geographic Code]
New Website 
La Paz, Tarlac 
 Official government website
Philippine Census Information

Municipalities of Tarlac